Wilson Greenwood (July 1871 – January 1943) was an English footballer who played as an outside forward. He was born in Padiham, Lancashire. He played in The Football League for Sheffield United, Grimsby Town and Newton Heath.

References

External links
Profile at StretfordEnd.co.uk
Profile at MUFCInfo.com

1871 births
1943 deaths
English footballers
Association football outside forwards
Manchester United F.C. players
Accrington F.C. players
Sheffield United F.C. players
Grimsby Town F.C. players
People from Padiham
Warmley F.C. players